"All for You" is a song by Japanese recording artist Namie Amuro, for her seventh studio album Queen of Hip-Pop (2005), released on July 22, 2004, under Avex Trax. The song was the first of three consecutive singles to sell over 100,000 copies. "All for You" has been certified gold for shipments of over 100,000 by the Recording Industry Association of Japan. It was used as the drama Kimi ga Omoide ni Naru Mae ni's theme song.

Track listing

TV performances 
 July 7, 2004 – Music Station
 July 16, 2004 – Pop Jam
 July 16, 2004 – AX Music Factory
 July 27, 2004 – CDTV Special
 August 8, 2004 – MTV Buzz Asia Concert
 September 3, 2004 – Music Station
 September 6, 2004 – Hey! Hey! Hey!
 September 9, 2004 – AX Music Factory

Charts

Personnel 
 Namie Amuro – vocals
 Ryoki Matsumoto – chorus
 Jun Abe – keyboard, piano
 Kenji Suzuki – guitar
 Rush by Takashi Katou – Strings

References

2004 singles
Namie Amuro songs
Japanese television drama theme songs
2004 songs
Avex Trax singles